ONP or Onp may refer to:

Olympic National Park, a U.S. National Park in Washington State
Ortho-nitrophenol, a chemical substance, created by the hydrolization of Ortho-nitrophenyl-β-galactoside
Newport Municipal Airport (Oregon), a general aviation airport in Newport, Oregon
One Nation (Australia), an Australian political party
ONP (notation) (Polish), another name for Reverse Polish notation (RPN) sometimes used
Old Newsprint or Old Newspaper, a fiber grade separated in a materials recovery facility